1989 Football Championship of Ukrainian SSR was the 59th season of association football competition of the Ukrainian SSR, which was part of the Soviet Second League. The Soviet Second League was split after the season and all national (republican) competitions were placed at the lower league (4th division), while the upper league (3rd division) was transformed into a buffer league. 

The 1989 Football Championship of Ukrainian SSR was won for the first time by FC Volyn Lutsk. In the competition Volyn passed the 1988 Football Champion of Ukrainian SSR, FC Bukovyna Chernivtsi. Like the last season Bukovyna, Volyn also failed to earn promotion to the First League as it lost the inter-zonal playoffs.

Teams

Map

Promoted teams
Kremin Kremenchuk – Champion of the Fitness clubs competitions (KFK) (returning to professional level after an absence of 20 seasons)
Note: Unlike the previous team Dnipro Kremenchuk that represented the local factory Kredmash, the new team represented the Soviet factory of KrAZ and conditionally is considered as a successor of Dnipro.

Relegated teams 
Zorya Voroshylovhrad – (Returning after 2 seasons)
Kolos Nikopol – (Returning after 10 seasons)

Moved outside of the Zone
 FC Desna Chernihiv was placed in the Zone 5
 FC Karpaty Lviv was revived and without participating in amateur competitions placed in the Zone 5

Renamed teams 
Prior to the start of the season Torpedo Lutsk was renamed to Volyn Lutsk.
Prior to the start of the season Spartak Zhytomyr was renamed to Polissya Zhytomyr.
Prior to the start of the season Novator Zhdanov was renamed to Novator Mariupol.

League standings

Top goalscorers

The following were the top ten goalscorers.

See also
 Soviet Second League

External links
 1989 Soviet Second League, Zone 6 (Ukrainian SSR football championship). Luhansk football portal

1989
3
Soviet
Soviet
football
Football Championship of the Ukrainian SSR